The Fiat 12 HP is a car produced by the Italian manufacturer Fiat in 1901 and 1902. The car was designed by the engineer Giovanni Enrico, successor to the Faccioli who had engineered the first three Fiat models, it was the first Fiat and one of the first cars of this era equipped with a two-block four-cylinder engines. It was manufactured in 106 copies in the plant Corso Dante. A racing version was also made the 12 HP 1901 Corsa which incorporated the same engine. This car put an end to the domination of Panhard on European courses.

At the end of 1901, a version equipped with a new engine is also proposed.

References 

12 HP
Cars introduced in 1901
1900s cars
Veteran vehicles